The plain-flanked rail (Rallus wetmorei) is an Endangered species of bird in subfamily Rallinae of family Rallidae, the rails, gallinules, and coots. It is endemic to Venezuela.

Taxonomy and systematics

The plain-flanked rail has been suggested to be conspecific with the mangrove rail (R. longirostris) but this treatment has not been accepted by major taxonomic systems because the two do not interbreed where their ranges overlap. The plain-flanked rail is monotypic.

Description

It has a brown bill. The sexes are alike. Adults have dull gray-brown upperparts with darker centers to the feathers. They have a white loral streak on their gray-brown face and a whitish throat. Their underparts are brown with no barring.

Distribution and habitat

The plain-flanked rail is known from only a few locations on the Caribbean coast of Venezuela between eastern Falcón and western Aragua states. It primarily inhabits coastal mangroves and has also been found in emergent vegetation of brackish and saltwater lagoons and marshes.

Behavior

Movement

The plain-flanked rail is apparently sedentary.

Feeding

Nothing is known about the plain-flanked rail's foraging behavior or diet. Both are assumed to be similar to those of the mangrove rail, which inhabits similar landscapes. That species has a very diverse diet that includes animal prey such as crustaceans (especially crabs and crayfish), molluscs, leeches, aquatic and terrestrial insects, fish, and amphibians. It also feeds on plant matter such as seeds, berries, and tubers, especially in winter.

Breeding

The plain-flanked rail's breeding season is not known in detail but includes both April and May. A few nests have been discovered; they were platforms of twigs and leaves placed on mangrove roots or in mangrove trees. Clutch sizes of four to seven eggs have been noted. Both members of a pair incubate the eggs. The incubation period and time to fledging are not known.

Vocalization

The plain-flanked rail's "advertising call" is "a series of loud, rapid 'kek-kek-kek...kek-kek-kek' notes" that are given in duet and preceded by "soft growling 'grrrrr' calls". Courting males make "a series of evenly spaced harsh 'kek' notes". The species also makes a grunting call.

Status

The IUCN originally assessed the plain-flanked rail in 1988 as Threatened; from 1994 it has been classed as Endangered. It has a very small range and an estimated population of 50 to 200 mature individuals that is believed to be decreasing. Its mangrove habitat continues to be destroyed by development for tourism and what remains is also threatened by domestic and industrial pollution.

References

Birds of Venezuela
Rallus
Birds described in 1944
Taxa named by John T. Zimmer
Taxonomy articles created by Polbot